Konstantin Ramul (30 May 1879  – 11 February 1975) was an Estonian professor of psychology and longtime chair of psychology at the University of Tartu. He is best known for his work on the history of experimental psychology.

Ramul believed that history is dependent upon psychology, though the philosopher of science Ernest Nagel criticized him for "not stat[ing] clearly the type of psychological investigation which is relevant to the historian's task" (Nagel 1934, pp. 599–600).

Selected publications
 Ramul, Konstantin. 1936. "Psychologie und Geschichte."  Archiv für die gesamte Psychologie 95(1-2), pp. 1–14.
 ———. 1960. "The Problem of Measurement in the Psychology of the Eighteenth Century."  American Psychologist 15, pp. 256–265.
 ———. 1974. Iz istorii psikhologii. Tartu: Tartuskiĭ gos. universitet.

References
 Allik, Jüri. 1998. . Up-Date (Winter 1998-99), pp. 4–5.
 Nagel, Ernest. 1934. "The Eighth International Congress of Philosophy."  Journal of Philosophy 31(21), pp. 589–601.

External links
Introduction (in Estonian) and photo

1879 births
1975 deaths
People from Kuressaare
People from Kreis Ösel
Eastern Orthodox Christians from Estonia
Estonian psychologists
Academic staff of the University of Tartu